Zintis Ekmanis (born 17 May 1958) is a former Latvian bobsledder who competed from the early 1980s to the mid-1990s. Competing in four Winter Olympics, he won the bronze medal in the two-man event at Sarajevo in 1984.

Ekmanis also won a bronze medal in the two-man event at the 1985 FIBT World Championships in Cervinia. During the Bobsleigh World Cup of 1986-7, he finished third in the two-man event.

References
1988 bobsleigh two-man results
1992 bobsleigh two-man results
1994 bobsleigh two-man results
Bobsleigh two-man Olympic medalists 1932-56 and since 1964

History of bobsleigh in Latvia featuring Ekmanis

External links
 
 
 

1958 births
Living people
Latvian male bobsledders
Russian male bobsledders
Soviet male bobsledders
Olympic bobsledders of the Soviet Union
Olympic bobsledders of Latvia
Olympic bronze medalists for the Soviet Union
Olympic medalists in bobsleigh
Bobsledders at the 1984 Winter Olympics
Bobsledders at the 1988 Winter Olympics
Bobsledders at the 1992 Winter Olympics
Bobsledders at the 1994 Winter Olympics
Medalists at the 1984 Winter Olympics